Bugry is the name of several inhabited localities in Russia.

Altai Krai
As of 2010, one rural locality in Altai Krai bear this name:
Bugry, Altai Krai, a settlement in Rubtsovsky District

Bryansk Oblast
As of 2010, two rural localities in Bryansk Oblast bear this name:
Bugry, Karachevsky District, Bryansk Oblast, a village in Karachevsky District
Bugry, Komarichsky District, Bryansk Oblast, a settlement in Komarichsky District

Kostroma Oblast
As of 2010, one rural locality in Kostroma Oblast bears this name:
Bugry, Kostroma Oblast, a village in Kostromskoy District

Kursk Oblast
As of 2010, two rural localities in Kursk Oblast bear this name:
Bugry, Fatezhsky District, Kursk Oblast, a village in Fatezhsky District
Bugry, Zolotukhinsky District, Kursk Oblast, a khutor in Zolotukhinsky District

Leningrad Oblast
As of 2010, two rural localities in Leningrad Oblast bear this name:
Bugry, Gatchinsky District, Leningrad Oblast, a village in Gatchinsky District
Bugry, Vsevolozhsky District, Leningrad Oblast, a settlement in Vsevolozhsky District

Republic of Mordovia
As of 2010, one rural locality in the Republic of Mordovia bear this name:
Bugry, Republic of Mordovia, a village in Ichalkovsky District

Nizhny Novgorod Oblast
As of 2010, one rural locality in Nizhny Novgorod Oblast bears this name:
Bugry, Nizhny Novgorod Oblast, a village in Dalnekonstantinovsky District

Novgorod Oblast
As of 2010, two rural localities in Novgorod Oblast bears this name:
Bugry (settlement), Novgorod Oblast, a settlement in Khvoyninsky District
Bugry (village), Novgorod Oblast, a village in Khvoyninsky District

Oryol Oblast
As of 2010, one rural locality in Oryol Oblast bears this name:
Bugry, Oryol Oblast, a village in Mtsensky District

Penza Oblast
As of 2010, one rural locality in Penza Oblast bears this name:
Bugry, Penza Oblast, a village Tamalinsky District

Perm Krai
As of 2010, one rural locality in Perm Krai bears this name:
Bugry, Perm Krai, a village in Chastinsky District

Pskov Oblast
As of 2010, two rural localities in Pskov Oblast bears this name:
Bugry, Velikoluksky District, Pskov Oblast, a village in Velikoluksky District
Bugry, Nevelsky District, Pskov Oblast, a village in Nevelsky District

Rostov Oblast
As of 2010, one inhabited locality in Rostov Oblast bear this name:
Bugry, Rostov Oblast, a khutor in Semikarakorsky District

Samara Oblast
As of 2010, one inhabited locality in Samara Oblast bear this name:
Bugry, Samara Oblast, a settlement in Kinelsky District

Sverdlovsk Oblast
As of 2010, one inhabited locality in Sverdlovsk Oblast bear this name:
Bugry, Sverdlovsk Oblast, a village

Tomsk Oblast
As of 2010, one inhabited locality in Tomsk Oblast bear this name:
Bugry, Tomsk Oblast, a village in Parabelsky District

Tyumen Oblast
As of 2010, one inhabited locality in Tyumen Oblast bear this name:
Bugry, Tyumen Oblast, a village in Nizhnetavdinsky District

Vologda Oblast
As of 2010, two rural localities in Vologda Oblast bear this name:
Bugry, Ustyuzhensky District, Vologda Oblast, a village in Ustyuzhensky District
Bugry, Sheksninsky District, Vologda Oblast, a village in Sheksninsky District